Here It Is may refer to:

Music

Albums
Here It Is (The Cover Girls album) 1992
Here It Is Jevetta Steele 1993
Here It Is (Freddie Jackson album) 1994

Songs
"Here It Is", by Dizzy Gillespie Composed by Dizzy Gillespie
"Here It Is", by Leonard Cohen / Sharon Robinson Composed by Leonard Cohen / Sharon Robinson 2001 Ten New Songs
"Here It Is", by Freddie Jackson Composed by Paul Laurence Here It Is (Freddie Jackson album)